The 12367 / 12368 Vikramshila Superfast Express connects Bhagalpur, one of the largest cities of Bihar to India's capital New Delhi. The train passes through the major cities of Kanpur, Mughalsarai, Lakhisarai, Patna, Barh, Mokama,  and Jamalpur, before ending its journey at Bhagalpur.
  
Vikramshila Express runs at a maximum permissible speed of 130 km/h, joining the list of only a few selected trains having general coaches that run at 130 km/h.

Train number
12367  to 
12368 Anand Vihar Terminal to Bhagalpur

History
Vikramshila Express was inaugurated on 6 March 1977 between Bhagalpur and New Delhi. After the introduction of Magadh Express in 1980, Vikramshila ran from Bhagalpur to Patna Junction and from Patna, the coaches of Vikramshila were attached to Magadh Express and the train was then named Magadh Express, which used to leave Patna Jn. at 8:00 pm.

Later on, when Mr. Nitish Kumar became the Railway Minister of India, he gave back Vikramshila Express its own existence and since then the Vikramshila Express again runs from Bhagalpur to Anand Vihar on its own name. This was a great relief for the passengers of Bhagalpur, Sultanganj, Bariarpur, Jamalpur Junction, Hathidah Junction, Mokama Junction Lakhisarai, and Mokama.

Vikramshila Express is the most important train for Bhagalpur region. This train is for the ease of the people of Bhagalpur, Jamalpur and nearby areas to travel to Delhi.

Vikramshila Express started running end-to-end with a WAP-7 electric locomotive from Bhagalpur Junction to Anand Vihar Terminal from 3 June 2019 and vice-versa from 1 June 2019. It started using LHB coach from 12 July 2017 and got an MPS upgrade from 110 km/h to 130 km/h on 18 February 2020. From 1 December 2020, the Vikramshila Express departs from Anand Vihar terminus at 13:15 hrs and reaches Bhagalpur junction at 08:15 hrs. The other way, the train departs from Bhagalpur junction at 11:50 hrs and reaches Anand Vihar Terminus at 7:20 hrs.

Timetable
12367 Vikramshila Express departs from Bhagalpur at 11:50hrs & arrives Anand Vihar at 07:20hrs.
12368 Vikramshila Express departs from Anand Vihar at 13:15hrs & arrives Bhagalpur at 08:15hrs.

Traction

As the entire route is now fully electrified, Vikramshila Express runs with a HOG-equipped WAP-7 locomotive of Ghaziabad Electric Loco Shed from Anand Vihar Terminal to Bhagalpur Junction and vice versa.

Route & Halts

References

Transport in Delhi
Transport in Bhagalpur
Express trains in India
Rail transport in Bihar
Rail transport in Uttar Pradesh
Rail transport in Delhi
Railway services introduced in 2003
Named passenger trains of India